Katosi Water Works (KWW), also Katosi Water Treatment Plant is a water purification and distribution project in Uganda.

Location
The water treatment facility is located in the lakeside town of Katosi, in Ntenjeru subcounty, Mukono District, in the Buganda Region of Uganda. The geographical coordinates of the water treatment plant are: 00°07'02.0"N, 32°46'37.0"E (Latitude:0.117222; Longitude:32.776944).

Overview
As far back as 2011, the Uganda government, through the National Water and Sewerage Corporation (NWSC), began to make plans to construct a new water treatment facility at Katosi, to augment the facilities at Ggaba (Ggaba I, II & III), to meet the needs of the rapidly expanding population of Kampala and surrounding districts.

GKW Consult GmbH, in association with Alliance Consultants Limited, were contracted by the NWSC to provide consulting services for the preparation of designs for the new Drinking Water Treatment Plant near Katosi. Tendering and supervision of the construction works, are part of this consulting contract.

The target population is the estimated 4.5 million people by the year 2025 and 7 million by the year 2040, expected to inhabit the city of Kampala, and its surrounding metropolis.

Ownership
The water treatment facility is wholly owned by the National Water and Sewerage Corporation, a government parastatal company, responsible for provision of potable water and sewerage services nationwide.

Construction
The construction of the Katosi Water Treatment Plant is part of a master plan called Kampala Water Lake Victoria Water and  Sanitation Project, which was developed in 2011. The project involves improving water supply and improve sanitation services to all of the 2 million inhabitants of the city of Kampala at that time.

The feasibility study was conducted by BRL Ingenierie SA, IGIP and WE Consult. In June 2016, GKW Consult GmbH and Alliance Consultants Limited were selected as consulting engineers. Tenders for the construction contract were advertised in the first quarter of 2017, with bid evaluation expected in May 2017.

The contract was awarded to a consortium comprising Suez International of Egypt and Sogea-Satom of France. In June 2018, NWSC signed a binding contract with the consortium to design and build Katosi Water Works, together with the related intake, storage and transmission infrastructure at a contract price of €84 million (USh378 billion). Construction started in January 2019 and is expected to conclude in March 2021. As of May 2020, construction was estimated to have progressed to 80 percent. Test pumping is planned during the fourth quarter of 2020, with commissioning expected during the first quarter of 2021.

Financing
The funding of the Kampala Water Lake Victoria Water and Sanitation Project (WATSAN), is as illustrated in the table below:

 Note: Totals are slightly off due to rounding.

In February 2019, an agreement was signed between the French Development Agency (AFD), represented by Stéphanie Rivoal, the French Ambassador to Uganda and the government of Uganda, represented by Matia Kasaija, the Ugandan Finance Minister for a 20-year USh630 billion (€150 million) loan, representing the EIB's and AFD's funding participation in this project.

Powering the plant
In August 2020, Umeme, the largest electricity distribution utility in Uganda, announced that it was constructing a dedicated double circuit 33kV power line from its substation in Mbalala (not Mbarara), along the Kampala–Jinja Highway, to supply stable power to the water treatment plant. The power line is expected to be completed in December 2020.

Recent events
In April 2021, with the construction approximately 95 percent complete, the contractors and NWSC engineers started testing the electrical-mechanical systems of the new plant. These included the various electrical control units, pressure gauges, the intake and output pipes, landscaping and staff housing. Commissioning of the completed system  is expected in the fourth week of April 2021.

In September 2021, Uganda's Minister of Water and Environment, Sam Cheptoris, the chairman of National Water and Sewerage Corporation (NWSC), Engineer Badru Kiggundu and the CEO of NWSC, Doctor Silver Mugisha, toured the complete water treatment plant. The infrastructure includes the purification plant in Katosi, the storage reservoirs on Nsumba Hill and Sonde Hill, in Mukono District and a booster pump at Namugongo, in Wakiso District.

See also
 Ministry of Water and Environment (Uganda)
 Kinshasa Industrial Water Treatment Complex

References

External links
 Website of National Water & Sewerage Corporation
 Website of Ministry of Water and Environment (Uganda)
 NWSC to increase water supply by 50% As of  5 August 2015.
 Uganda: Katosi drinking water plant to be put into service in February 2021 As of 18 August 2020.

Buildings and structures in Uganda
Mukono District
Water resources management
Central Region, Uganda
2021 establishments in Uganda